Súper Sangre Joven is the debut studio album by Argentine rapper Duki. The album was produced mainly by the Argentine group of producers NEUEN, which is made up of Oniria, Yesan and Ferla Flame, the rest of the songs were produced by Sky, Asan, El Sidechain and Fnxty. Súper Sangre Joven was released on November 1, 2019 via SSJ Records in association with Dale Play Records. The songs were posted on Duki's YouTube channel one day before their release. The album contains collaborations with artists such as C. Tangana, Khea, LeeBrian, Alemán, Ysy A, Marcianos Crew, Lucho SSJ, Sfera Ebbasta and Eladio Carrión.

Background and composition
In Súper Sangre Joven, Duki talks about drugs, sex, love and the success he's having in his career. The first single to be released was "Hitboy" with Argentine rapper Khea, it was released on June 5, 2019. The second single to be released was "Goteo" on August 7, 2019. The third single "A Punta de Espada" with Argentine rapper Ysy a was released on October 17, 2019. The fourth single "Te Traje Flores" was released on October 31, 2019.

Track listing
All tracks was written by Duki.

Personnel
Credits retrieved from AllMusic.

Primary artist
 Duki – lead vocals, songwriter

Additional musicians
 C. Tangana – vocals 
 Khea – vocals 
 LeeBrian – vocals 
 Alemán – vocals 
 Ysy A – vocals 
 Marcianos Crew – vocals 
 Lucho SSJ – vocals 
 Eladio Carrión – vocals 
 Sfera Ebbasta – vocals 

Production
 NEUEN (Oniria, Yesan and Feria Flame) – producer 
 Sky – producer 
 Asan – producer 
 Fnxty – co-producer 
 El Sidechain – mixing, co-producer

Charts

Certifications

References

2019 debut albums
Albums produced by Sky Rompiendo
Duki (rapper) albums